Rivaldo Vítor Borba Ferreira (born 19 April 1972), known simply as Rivaldo, is a Brazilian former footballer who played mainly as an attacking midfielder but also as a second striker, and on occasion deployed as a wide midfielder or as a winger. Rivaldo is regarded as one of the greatest players of all time and among the most skillful and creative players of his generation. He was renowned for his bending free kicks, bicycle kicks, feints, powerful ball striking from distance, and ability to both score and create goals. In 1999, he won the Ballon d'Or and was named FIFA World Player of the Year. In 2004, he was named by Pelé in the FIFA 100 list of the world's greatest living players. With success at club and international level, he is one of nine players to have won the FIFA World Cup, the UEFA Champions League and the Ballon d'Or. 

Rivaldo started his career in 1991 with Brazilian club Santa Cruz, going on to have spells at Mogi Mirim, a loan spell at Corinthians, and Palmeiras. In 1996, he moved to Europe with Spanish side Deportivo de La Coruña, where his performances in his only season there led him to sign for Barcelona in 1997. At Barcelona, he formed a successful partnership with Dutch international Patrick Kluivert, and won consecutive La Liga titles in 1998 and 1999, as well as the 1998 Copa del Rey. Rivaldo notably scored a hattrick against Valencia in June 2001 which qualified Barcelona for the 2001-02 UEFA Champions League; the last goal was a last minute 20-yard bicycle kick winner and the hattrick itself is often ranked as the greatest ever. During his five-year tenure there, he scored 130 goals, ranking him among Barcelona's highest goalscorers of all time. 

In 2002, Rivaldo signed for Italian club A.C. Milan, winning the Coppa Italia and the UEFA Champions League in his only season there, however his performances were underwhelming and he cancelled his contract with Milan in late 2004. He went on to play for Cruzeiro, Olympiacos, AEK Athens, Bunyodkor, a loan spell at São Paulo, Kabuscorp and São Caetano. In March 2014, Rivaldo announced his retirement from professional football, however since June 2015 he made appearances for Mogi Mirim, before retiring once again in August 2015.

From 1993 to 2003, Rivaldo played 74 matches and scored 35 goals for Brazil and is the seventh highest goalscorer for the country. He helped Brazil reach the final of the 1998 FIFA World Cup, and won the 1999 Copa América where he was named player of the tournament. Rivaldo starred in an attacking trio with Ronaldo and Ronaldinho in the 2002 FIFA World Cup winning team. Scoring in five of Brazil's seven games at the tournament, Rivaldo was named in the FIFA World Cup All-Star Team in 2002 having also previously been selected in 1998. He is an inductee to the Brazilian Football Museum Hall of Fame.

Early life
Born in Recife, Pernambuco, Brazil, Rivaldo had a poor upbringing in the favelas of the city. His physical appearance still marks the poverty he experienced in his childhood: malnourishment-caused bowleggedness and the loss of several teeth. Predominantly left footed, Rivaldo began his professional career at the age of 16, when he signed with Paulistano Futebol Clube in 1989, despite the Paulistano coaches believing him too physically weak to succeed. Rivaldo's father Romildo was killed in a road accident in 1989, but Rivaldo signed his first professional contract later that year.

Club career

Santa Cruz, Mogi Mirim and Corinthians
He went on to play for Santa Cruz in 1991. In 1992, he moved south to the state of São Paulo where he played for Mogi Mirim in the second tier of Brazilian football. In 1993, he moved to the state capital to play for Corinthians in the first division, on loan.

Palmeiras
In the next year, he switched local allegiances and moved to Palmeiras, helping the club successfully defend its league championship in 1994 and winning Campeonato Paulista in 1996. In both 1993 and 1994, he was honoured by the authoritative publication Placar Magazine with the Bola de Ouro for the best player in his position.

Deportivo
Before the 1996 Olympics, Parma announced that they had signed Rivaldo and his teammate Amaral from Palmeiras. After the Olympics, there was a dispute, and rather than Italy, Rivaldo moved to Spain as he joined Deportivo La Coruña in La Liga. He only stayed for one season, but nonetheless it proved to be a successful one for both him and the club. Rivaldo was the joint-fourth top goalscorer of the season, with 21 goals from 41 matches, as Deportivo finished third in the league.

Barcelona
Rivaldo switched to FC Barcelona in 1997 in a transfer deal securing Deportivo a 4 billion pesetas (around $26 million) transfer fee, with Sir Bobby Robson convincing Barcelona to sign Rivaldo ahead of Steve McManaman by saying that Rivaldo would guarantee the team many goals.

In his first season at Barcelona, Rivaldo was the second top goalscorer with 19 goals in 34 matches, as Barcelona won The Double of La Liga and Copa del Rey. In 1999, he won another La Liga title with Barcelona, and once again was the league's second highest scorer with 24 goals. In 1999, Rivaldo was named FIFA World Player of the Year and he also received the Ballon d'Or. After Barcelona's unsuccessful Champions League campaign, Rivaldo was linked with a move away from Camp Nou. Then Manchester United captain Roy Keane was reported stating Rivaldo was the player he most wanted United to sign.

In his third season at Barcelona, Rivaldo fell out with manager Louis van Gaal, when he insisted playing as a playmaker rather than on the left wing. Even though he had a strained relationship with Van Gaal, Rivaldo went on to score 10 goals in the season's Champions League as the club reached the semi-finals. Van Gaal was fired in June 2000.

In the following 2000–01 season, Rivaldo was once again the second highest goalscorer of the league, with 23 goals. In the last game of the season, against Valencia CF, Rivaldo scored a hat-trick to win the game 3–2. Frequently ranked the greatest hat-trick ever, his first goal was a trademark bending free kick that curled into the bottom right corner, the second saw him send the Valencia player the wrong way with a feint before a strike with little back-lift from 25 yards swerved into the bottom left corner of the net, and his match-winning third occurred after Rivaldo controlled the ball with the chest from the edge of the 18-yard box and executed an overhead bicycle kick in the 89th minute, which he regards as the best goal of his career. An ecstatic Rivaldo ripped off his jersey and started swinging it over his head during his goal celebrations, while Barcelona club president Joan Gaspart broke with convention in the stadium's VIP box by punching the air with both fists and yelling his delight next to the opposition delegation. The win pushed Barcelona ahead of Valencia to secure a place in the 2001–02 Champions League. After the game Rivaldo stated; "What happened tonight has been incredible. I dedicate the winning goal to all the players who have fought so hard all season and all the supporters who have suffered so much. I'm delighted to have made them happy with my goals." He scored a total of 36 goals that season. During his five-year tenure at Barcelona, Rivaldo scored 130 goals, ranking him among the club's highest goalscorers of all time.

Milan
Rivaldo signed a three-year deal with the Italian Serie A club Milan in 2002. With Milan, he won the Coppa Italia and the Champions League in the 2002–03 season. In August 2003, he also won the UEFA Super Cup before cancelling his contract with Milan in November that year. After leaving Milan, he briefly returned to Brazil, playing for Cruzeiro in Belo Horizonte. He came close to signing for Bolton Wanderers in 2004, though Bolton eventually pulled out of the deal. Due to his poor performances throughout the season, he won the Bidone d'Oro Award in 2003, which is given to the worst Serie A player during a particular season.

Cruzeiro
Rivaldo decided to return to Brazil in early 2004, by appointment of coach Vanderlei Luxemburgo who convinced him to play for the club, becoming Cruzeiro's major signing for the Copa Libertadores. However, his time with the team was very short, only eleven games and two goals. As reported by CNN, Rivaldo left the club after just two months due to the firing of Luxemburgo, Rivaldo's mentor earlier in his career. Rivaldo stated, "When he left, I preferred to leave as well. It was my decision because I consider Luxemburgo to be a special person."

Olympiacos
On 22 July 2004, Rivaldo joined Olympiacos of Superleague Greece. During the 2004–05 season he scored some stand out goals, one of them coming in his first derby against Panathinaikos that arguably turned out to be his most famous in an Olympiacos shirt: a bending free kick to send Olympiacos to victory over their eternal rivals. Another notable goal by Rivaldo came the following week in Olympiacos's matchday 6 UEFA Champions League group game in England against eventual champions Liverpool F.C. where he scored a deft free-kick in front of the Kop and put the Greek giants ahead. However Olympiacos were eliminated after Liverpool talisman Steven Gerrard scored with a 25-yard half volley 3 minutes from full-time. In the last game of Rivaldo's first season at Olympiacos, the club needed a victory in order to win the Alpha Ethniki championship, with Panathinaikos just one point behind. Olympiacos went on to beat Iraklis 0–1 in an away match in Thessaloniki, thanks to Rivaldo's goal, and secured the championship.

Rivaldo renewed his contract with Olympiacos for a third year, despite now being 34 years old. In July 2006, Rivaldo announced that the 2006–07 season with Olympiacos would be his last in Europe, before returning to Brazil. However, he quickly changed his decision and decided to stay for another year. The 2006–2007 season saw him score 17 goals in 27 Superleague matches. Rivaldo scored 43 goals in 81 games for Olympiacos.

AEK Athens
Rivaldo was released by Olympiacos after a dispute with the chairman of the club, Sokratis Kokkalis, who decided that he was too old to continue with the club. Later that summer, he signed for Super League club AEK Athens on 29 May 2007. His first Super League goal with the Athens' club came through a penalty in their 3–0 win against Panionios. Rivaldo had another great season and the team. After the winning match against Olympiacos with 4–0, Rivaldo showed his four fingers to the camera.

Rivaldo had stated his intention to leave Greece if the ruling went in favour of Olympiakos and AEK Athens were not declared champions. He stated: "A team that was not good enough to win the title on the pitch does not deserve the trophy."

Bunyodkor
Rivaldo announced on 25 August 2008 to a Greek Sport Radio Station that he agreed to continue his career at Bunyodkor in Uzbekistan, effective immediately, after what he described as an "extremely tempting contract offer".

Rivaldo signed a two-year contract worth €10.2 million and later signed an extension to extend the contract to 2011. On his debut for Bunyodkor, Rivaldo scored both goals in a 2–0 win. In 2009, Rivaldo became the first player in the world to score one, then two, then three, then four goals in four consecutive matches. He scored one goal in the first match and two goals in the second match against Navbahor. In the third match on 25 June 2009, Rivaldo scored a hat trick in a 4–0 win against Metallurg. In the fourth match Bunyodkor beat Sogdiana Jizzakh 5–0 and Rivaldo scored four in 17 minutes. After the end of the 2009 season, Rivaldo won UFF Topscorer award, having scored 20 league goals, and was runner up for UFF Player of the Year award. He scored 33 goals for the club in total. Rivaldo announced on 11 August 2010 on Twitter that he had cancelled his contract with Bunyodkor.

Mogi Mirim
On 18 November 2010, he announced he would be returning to Mogi Mirim, the club that he had started his career in the early 1990s, through his Social Networking site, saying: "After sorting out a lot of things outside of the country, I have decided to play the Paulista 2011 for Mogi Mirim, of whom I am President." However, he joined São Paulo in January 2011.

São Paulo
On 23 January 2011, Rivaldo joined São Paulo. He scored on his debut for them in the First Division against Linense with a wonderful goal. The ball was sent over from the left hand side of the pitch, before Rivaldo controlled the ball and took it over a defender using his left knee, and finished at the near post. He spent most part of March 2011 tending injury, but came back for following fixtures such as a 1–1 draw with Palmeiras and a 2–1 win over Corinthians.

Rivaldo stated on his Twitter account that he would leave São Paulo by the end of the season: "I just want to inform everybody that on Saturday, it's going to be my last training session at São Paulo. I've been told by the club's official that this is going to be my last season here." He added: "I'm not saying goodbye to football yet. I still have a lot to accomplish. I just wish I could hang up my boots at the end of 2012."

Kabuscorp
Rivaldo joined Angolan club Kabuscorp in January 2012. On 18 March, Rivaldo scored a hat-trick against Recreativo Caala. Rivaldo left Kabuscorp in November 2012 after the expiration of his contract.

São Caetano
In January 2013, Rivaldo joined São Caetano, signing a deal that ran to December. He scored his first goal for his new club in his debut against Sport Club Corinthians Paulista, 9 February. During the following match against Clube Atlético Bragantino Rivaldo once again scored, although his team lost with 2–1. In November 2013, he left the club due to knee problems.

Mogi Mirim
In December 2013, Rivaldo joined Mogi Mirim, signing a deal that ran until 2015. His son Rivaldinho played for the club. Rivaldo had only made one league appearance for the club when he retired in July 2015.

Retirement
In March 2014, the Brazilian icon officially retired from football after a career which spanned more than 20 years, and he decided to remain as the president of Mogi Mirim to help run the club and to look after his son, Rivaldinho. In a released statement, Rivaldo commented: "My history as a player has come to the end. With tears in my eyes today I would like to thank God, my family and all the support, the affection that I received during those 24 years as a player." However, he returned to the team in June 2015. On 14 July 2015, Rivaldo and Rivaldinho scored goals in the same match for the first time as Mogi Mirim beat Macaé 3–1.

On 18 January 2019, SCC Mohammédia announced Rivaldo as their new technical director and coach for the following season. The player denied that a deal was made, as he signed a pre-contract in which the club must achieve promotion from National (third tier in the Moroccan league).

International career
In 1993, he debuted for the Brazil national football team, scoring the only goal in a friendly match against Mexico. He was selected to represent Brazil at the 1996 Summer Olympics. The Brazilian team won the bronze medal, but Rivaldo was not selected for the third place playoff.

Rivaldo returned to the Brazil national team for the 1998 FIFA World Cup, where he scored three goals en route to the final, including two in the 3–2 quarter-final win against Denmark. Brazil were defeated 3–0 by hosts France in final, failing to defend their 1994 title. Rivaldo had not been a part of the victorious Brazilian team at the 1997 Copa América tournament, but was part of the successful defence of that title at the 1999 Copa América. Rivaldo finished the tournament as the top scorer, with five goals; one being an equaliser from a free-kick in a 2–1 win over Argentina in the quarter-finals, and two in the 3–0 victory over Uruguay in the final. He was named the Most Valuable Player of the tournament.

Rivaldo had been the centre of criticism when Brazil did not win tournaments, ever since the 1996 Olympics. In the 1–0 win against Colombia in November 2000, Rivaldo was booed so heavily that he threatened to retire from playing for his country.

The zenith and nadir of Rivaldo's national team career came at the 2002 FIFA World Cup, hosted in South Korea and Japan, where he was able to erase the disappointment of the previous World Cup Final defeat, helping Brazil win their fifth World Cup. Featuring in an attacking trio with Ronaldo and Ronaldinho, dubbed "the three R's", Rivaldo scored in the first five games while Ronaldo scored in four matches. Despite a successful tournament, Rivaldo was involved in a controversial incident against Turkey. Near the end of the match, with the ball out of play, Turkish defender Hakan Ünsal kicked a ball towards Rivaldo, who was waiting at the corner flag. The ball struck his thigh, but Rivaldo fell to the ground clutching his face. The referee sent the Turkish player off with a second yellow card. After a video review, Rivaldo was fined 11,670 Swiss francs by FIFA.

Rivaldo's goal against Belgium in the second round prompted Belgian coach Robert Waseige to name him as the deciding factor. Ronaldinho assisted Rivaldo to score the equaliser against England in the quarter-finals before Ronaldinho scored the winning goal in a 2–1 victory. Brazil met Germany in the final, and went on to win the tournament with a 2–0 victory, courtesy of two goals by Ronaldo with Rivaldo involved in both goals. The first came after Rivaldo's shot was saved by German goalkeeper Oliver Kahn with Ronaldo scoring the rebound, and the second saw Rivaldo fool the German defence with a dummy as the ball ran on to Ronaldo who finished. Rivaldo was named by Brazil coach Luiz Felipe Scolari as the best player of the tournament. Rivaldo along with Ronaldo and Ronaldinho were named in the FIFA World Cup All-Star Team.

Rivaldo's last cap was on 19 November 2003 in Curitiba in a 3–3 draw with Uruguay. He played 79 minutes before being substituted for Luís Fabiano. He had scored his last goal just three days earlier from the penalty spot in a 1–1 draw with Peru. In his time with the national side, Rivaldo won 74 caps, and scored 35 goals.

Style of play
Regarded as one of the best players of his generation and also one of the greatest players of all time, Rivaldo was a elegant, skillful, and creative player, known for his dribbling ability, use of feints, tricks, flair, balance, first touch, and close ball control. Despite his height, he was also extremely agile. A dead-ball specialist, Rivaldo was renowned for his bending free kicks and penalty taking, as well as his ability to score from distance with powerful strikes. Left footed and possessing excellent technique, he was also known for his ball striking from volleys, and for having a penchant for scoring from bicycle kicks.

Although he was not a true striker, Rivaldo was a prolific goalscorer, capable of playing in several creative and offensive positions: during the prime of his career, a period where he won the Ballon d'Or and was named FIFA World Player of the Year, he was often deployed in a playmaking attacking midfield role as a classic number 10, due to his vision and passing ability, which made him an excellent assist provider. He could also function as a second striker, or as a left winger, a position which he often occupied earlier in his career, due to his acceleration and crossing ability. Although predominantly left footed, he was capable of playing on either wing.

In 2002, John Carlin of The Guardian noted that Rivaldo "combines to dazzling effect the two essential qualities of the ideal footballer: artistry and efficiency." His colleague, Rob Smyth, echoed his views in 2008, commenting: "if you could marry British will with continental skill, you would have the perfect footballer. Such a mixed recipe was thrillingly in evidence in Diego Maradona. Since then, however, perhaps only Rivaldo has fused the two qualities," noting that like the Argentinian, the Brazilian had "bronca" (the word used repeatedly in Maradona's autobiography to refer to "anger, fury, hatred, resentment, bitter discontent). Former Dutch international Ruud Gullit believed that Rivaldo's ability and qualities were often overlooked, as "he played in the same era as Brazilian counterparts Ronaldo and Ronaldinho."

Career statistics

Club

International

Scores and results list Brazil's goal tally first, score column indicates score after each Rivaldo goal.

Honours
Palmeiras
 Brazilian Série A: 1994
 Campeonato Paulista:  1996

Barcelona
 La Liga: 1997–98, 1998–99
 Copa del Rey: 1997–98
 UEFA Super Cup: 1997

Milan
 Coppa Italia: 2002–03
 UEFA Champions League: 2002–03
 UEFA Super Cup: 2003

Cruzeiro
 Campeonato Mineiro: 2004

Olympiacos
 Alpha Ethniki/Super League Greece: 2004–05, 2005–06, 2006–07
 Greek Cup: 2004–05, 2005–06

Bunyodkor
 Uzbek League: 2008, 2009, 2010
 Uzbekistan Cup: 2008, 2010

Brazil U23
 Summer Olympics Bronze Medalist: 1996

Brazil
 FIFA World Cup: 2002; runner-up: 1998
 Copa América: 1999
 Confederations Cup: 1997
 Umbro Cup: 1995

Individual
 Brazilian Football Museum Hall of Fame
 Brazilian Bola de Prata (2): 1993, 1994
 La Liga Foreign Player of the Year: 1997–98
 FIFA World Cup All-Star Team (2): 1998, 2002
 ESM Team of the Year (2): 1998–99, 1999–2000
 World Soccer Player of the Year: 1999
 Onze d'Or: 1999
 Ballon d'Or: 1999
 FIFA World Player of the Year: 1999
 Copa América Golden Boot: 1999
 Copa América Golden Ball: 1999
 Trofeo EFE: 1999
 UEFA Champions League top goalscorer: 1999–2000
 IFFHS World's Top Goal Scorer: 2000
 FIFA World Player of the Year: Bronze award 2000
 FIFA World Cup Silver Shoe: 2002
 FIFA XI: 2002
 FIFA 100
 Greek Championship best foreign player (2): 2006, 2007
 Uzbek League top goalscorer: 2009

See also 

 List of men's footballers with the most official appearances
 List of association football families

References

External links

 
 
 

1972 births
Living people
Sportspeople from Recife
Brazilian footballers
Association football forwards
Santa Cruz Futebol Clube players
Mogi Mirim Esporte Clube players
Sport Club Corinthians Paulista players
Sociedade Esportiva Palmeiras players
Deportivo de La Coruña players
FC Barcelona players
A.C. Milan players
Cruzeiro Esporte Clube players
Olympiacos F.C. players
AEK Athens F.C. players
FC Bunyodkor players
São Paulo FC players
Kabuscorp S.C.P. players
Associação Desportiva São Caetano players
Campeonato Brasileiro Série B players
Campeonato Brasileiro Série A players
La Liga players
Serie A players
Super League Greece players
Uzbekistan Super League players
Girabola players
Campeonato Brasileiro Série C players
UEFA Champions League winning players
World Soccer Magazine World Player of the Year winners
Ballon d'Or winners
Brazil under-20 international footballers
Olympic footballers of Brazil
Brazil international footballers
Footballers at the 1996 Summer Olympics
1997 FIFA Confederations Cup players
1998 FIFA World Cup players
1999 Copa América players
2002 FIFA World Cup players
Olympic bronze medalists for Brazil
Olympic medalists in football
FIFA Confederations Cup-winning players
Copa América-winning players
FIFA World Cup-winning players
FIFA World Player of the Year winners
FIFA 100
UEFA Champions League top scorers
Brazilian expatriate footballers
Brazilian expatriate sportspeople in Spain
Brazilian expatriate sportspeople in Italy
Brazilian expatriate sportspeople in Greece
Brazilian expatriate sportspeople in Uzbekistan
Brazilian expatriate sportspeople in Angola
Brazilian expatriate sportspeople in Morocco
Expatriate footballers in Spain
Expatriate footballers in Italy
Expatriate footballers in Greece
Expatriate footballers in Uzbekistan
Expatriate footballers in Angola
Naturalised citizens of Spain
SCC Mohammédia non-playing staff
Medalists at the 1996 Summer Olympics